Thomas Johnson Britten (6 March 1858 – 24 October 1910) was an international footballer. Though born and raised in rural Herefordshire in England, his birth was registered in the nearest town Presteigne across the Welsh border and he was deemed eligible to play for the Wales national football team, which he did twice in 1878 and 1880. He made his debut on 23 March 1878 against Scotland and played his second and last match on 27 March 1880 against the same opposition.

Britten had other links to Scotland as he worked in  Glasgow for several years, playing for the local club Parkgrove and for a Glasgow select in an inter-city challenge match. His profession as a mining engineer took him around Britain, and he appeared for several other regional representative teams (which convened fairly regularly in that era). In 1880 he was playing club football in Wales for Presteigne, and in 1887 he was with London club Crusaders. He declined the offer of another Wales cap at least twice in the 1880s, and due to his birthplace he was also invited to play for England but remained on the reserve list and never made an appearance. He later emigrated to South Africa where he was a noted figure in the field of mining machinery.

See also
 List of Wales international footballers born outside Wales

References

1858 births
Welsh footballers
English footballers
Wales international footballers
Sportspeople from Herefordshire
1910 deaths
Association football forwards
Parkgrove F.C. players
Crusaders F.C. (London) players 
British emigrants to South Africa